Les Misérables is a novel by Victor Hugo.

Les Misérables may also refer to:
 Les Misérables (musical), a 1980 stage musical
Les Misérables: The Dream Cast in Concert, a 1995 concert video of the musical
 Les Misérables in Concert: The 25th Anniversary, a 2010 concert video of the musical

Film and television

Adaptations of the novel
 Les Misérables (1909 film), an American film by J. Stuart Blackton
 Les Misérables (1917 film), an American film by Frank Lloyd
 Les Misérables (1925 film), a French film by Henri Fescourt
 Les Misérables (1934 film), a French film by Raymond Bernard
 Les Misérables (1935 film), an American film by Richard Boleslawski
 Les Misérables (1944 film), an Egyptian film
 Les Misérables (1948 film), an Italian film by Riccardo Freda
 Les Misérables (1952 film), an American film by Lewis Milestone
 Les Misérables (1958 film), a French film by Jean-Paul Le Chanois and starring Jean Gabin
 Les Misérables (1967 film series), a film series in 10 parts
 Les Misérables (1978 film), an American TV film by Glenn Jordan
 Les Misérables (1982 film), a French film by Robert Hossein
 Les Misérables (1998 film), a film by Bille August, starring Liam Neeson and Geoffrey Rush
 Les Misérables (2000 miniseries), a 2000 television miniseries by Josée Dayan and starring Gérard Depardieu and John Malkovich
 Les Misérables: Shōjo Cosette, a 2007 Japanese anime television series
 Les Misérables (2012 film), a film by Tom Hooper and starring Hugh Jackman, Russell Crowe, and Anne Hathaway
 Les Misérables (British TV series), a 2018–2019 British television drama by Andrew Davies

Other
 Les Misérables (1995 film), a French film by Claude Lelouch
 Les Misérables (2019 film), a French drama film

Other uses
 Les Misérables (radio series), a 1937 radio adaptation by Orson Welles
 Les Misérables, an album by Lucid Fall

See also 
 Adaptations of Les Misérables
 Los miserables (disambiguation)